Thomas Karaberis (born 29 January 2002) is a Greek professional footballer who plays as a midfielder for Super League 2 club Panserraikos.

References

2002 births
Living people
Greek footballers
Greece youth international footballers
Super League Greece 2 players
Panserraikos F.C. players
Association football midfielders
Footballers from Thessaloniki
21st-century Greek people